Grace Gear (born 2 July 1998 in Welwyn Garden City) is an English professional squash player. As of February 2018, she was ranked number 121 in the world. In addition to competing in numerous professional PSA tournaments, she has also played in the Squash Premier League. She has also represented England.

References

1998 births
Living people
English female squash players
Sportspeople from Welwyn Garden City